Chirpy is a 2001 animated short by director John Goras, winner of Best Animation at the 2002 New York Underground Film Festival.

After showings in Germany and the UK, Chirpy was banned in London by ruling of the Westminster Council in 2002.

A sequel called Chirpy Returns was released in the summer of 2007.

Plot

Described by the director as his statement on modern pornography, the film follows the misadventures of a small yellow bird, which include the adult themes of hallucinogenic drugs and sexual intercourse with a brown horse.

Production
 Chirpy was "classically animated" using acetate, paper and 16mm film.

Reception

Animator Bill Plympton has described the film as "one of the sickest animated films ever made".

References

External links

2000s animated short films
2001 films
2001 animated films